Eldoret East Constituency was a former electoral constituency in Kenya. It was one of three constituencies in the former Uasin Gishu District, now Uasin Gishu County. The constituency was established for the 1988 elections.

Members of Parliament

Wards

References

External links 
Eldoret East Constituency

Constituencies in Rift Valley Province
Uasin Gishu County
Eldoret
1988 establishments in Kenya
Constituencies established in 1988
Former constituencies of Kenya